Philip D. Aines (April 30, 1899 – December 28, 1973) was an American football and basketball coach. He was a graduate of Middlebury College in Vermont and began his career as a coach at Kane High School in McKean County, Pennsylvania. He served as the head basketball coach at Millersville University of Pennsylvania from 1923 to 1925 and at Juniata College from 1925 to 1927.

References

External links
 

1899 births
1973 deaths
Basketball coaches from Vermont
Juniata Eagles football coaches
Juniata Eagles men's basketball coaches
Millersville Marauders football coaches
Millersville Marauders men's basketball coaches
High school football coaches in Pennsylvania
People from Middlebury, Vermont
Players of American football from Vermont